Nosphistica fenestrata is a moth in the family Lecithoceridae. It is found in Taiwan and southeastern China (Fujian).

References

Moths described in 1978
Moths of Asia
Moths of Taiwan
Nosphistica